Aruna Dharmasena (born 25 August 1993) is a Sri Lankan cricketer. He made his List A debut for Kalutara District in the 2016–17 Districts One Day Tournament on 22 March 2017.

References

External links
 

1993 births
Living people
Sri Lankan cricketers
Colts Cricket Club cricketers
Kalutara District cricketers
Cricketers from Colombo